The Venucia V-Online is a fastback compact crossover SUV produced by Dongfeng Nissan under the Venucia brand. The Chinese name is Da-V (大V) and sometimes referred to as Big V or Grand V.

History

The V-Online is positioned below the Venucia Xing and was presented on 20 August 2021. Shortly afterwards, it went on sale in mainland China.

Technical specifications
The vehicle is front-wheel drive and has a 7-speed dual clutch transmission.

References

External links
 Official Website

V-Online
Compact sport utility vehicles
Crossover sport utility vehicles
Front-wheel-drive vehicles
Cars introduced in 2021